The 2009 Paris–Roubaix was the 107th running of the Paris–Roubaix single-day cycling race, often known as the Hell of the North. The race was won by Tom Boonen, who won his third Paris–Roubaix (2005, 2008, 2009). Boonen finished the race alone, seconds ahead of Filippo Pozzato. Thor Hushovd arrived third, to round out the podium. The race was the eighth event in the inaugural UCI World Ranking series.

Key Moments
Nearly all of the riders featured in the top ten endured at least a minor crash.

A group of eleven riders formed the early breakaway, but was caught again with still about 60 kilometres to go. Six riders then eventually broke away from the rest of the peloton: Tom Boonen, Juan Antonio Flecha, Leif Hoste, Thor Hushovd, Filippo Pozzato and Johan Van Summeren.

At Carrefour de l'arbre, about 15 kilometres from the finish, Flecha crashed and took Hoste with him in his fall. Van Summeren and Pozzato were held back which allowed Boonen and Hushovd to break away. However, just a few hundred metres further, Hushovd also crashed and Boonen continued on his own. Pozzato came to within 10 seconds but never managed to close the gap, allowing Boonen to win.

During the race an official motorcycle crashed into the supporting crowd injuring sixteen people, four seriously. Three of the injured were flown by helicopter to hospitals in northern France.

Results

The cobblestones

Pre-Race favorites
Favorites included 2008 winner Tom Boonen, teammate and Tour of Flanders winner Stijn Devolder, Garmin–Slipstream's Martijn Maaskant, and 2006 winner, Fabian Cancellara.

References

External links

Paris–Roubaix
Paris-Roubaix
Paris-Roubaix
Paris-Roubaix